Arantxa Sánchez Vicario and Helena Suková were the defending champions, but none competed this year.

Julie Halard and Nathalie Tauziat won the title by defeating Jana Novotná and Lisa Raymond 6–1, 0–6, 6–1 in the final.

Seeds
The first four seeds received a bye into the second round.

Draw

Finals

Top half

Bottom half

References

External links
 Official results archive (ITF)
 Official results archive (WTA)

LA Women's Tennis Championships
1994 WTA Tour